Ukraine competed at the 2011 Winter Universiade in Erzurum, Turkey. 78 Ukrainian athletes (ninth largest team behind Russia, Turkey, Canada, Japan, South Korea, Finland, Czech Republic, and United States) competed in 8 sports out of 11 except for curling, freestyle skiing, and ice hockey. Ukraine won 15 medals, 6 of which were gold, and ranked 3rd behind Russia and South Korea.

Medallists

Figure skating

See also
 Ukraine at the 2011 Summer Universiade

References

Sources
 Archive of the official web site

Nations at the 2011 Winter Universiade
Ukraine at the Winter Universiade
Winter Universiade